Peter Schlickenrieder (born 16 February 1970 in Tegernsee) is a German cross-country skier who competed from 1992 to 2002. He earned a silver in the individual sprint at the 2002 Winter Olympics in Salt Lake City.

Schlickenrieder's best finish at the FIS Nordic World Ski Championships was a sixth in the individual sprint event in 2001. He also won seven times in FIS races and World Cup events between 1994 and 2002.

In April 2018, Schlickenrieder was appointed as head coach of the German National cross-country team. His appointment will last over the 2022 Winter Olympics.

Cross-country skiing results
All results are sourced from the International Ski Federation (FIS).

Olympic Games
 1 medal – (1 silver)

World Championships

World Cup

Season standings

Individual podiums
2 victories 
4 podiums

Team podiums

 1 victory – (1 ) 
 2 podiums – (2 )

References

External links 
 
 

German male cross-country skiers
Olympic cross-country skiers of Germany
Olympic silver medalists for Germany
Cross-country skiers at the 1994 Winter Olympics
Cross-country skiers at the 2002 Winter Olympics
1970 births
Living people
Olympic medalists in cross-country skiing
Medalists at the 2002 Winter Olympics
People from Miesbach (district)
Sportspeople from Upper Bavaria